Wojciech Piotr Gerwel (born 1 April 1978 in Gdynia) is a Polish diplomat who serves as an Undersecretary of State at the Ministry of Foreign Affairs since 2022. Prior to that ambassador of Poland to Vietnam (2018–2022).

Life 
Wojciech Gerwel has been educated at the Lester B. Pearson College, Victoria (1995–1997). He has graduated from economics and political science at the Simon Fraser University, Vancouver (B.A.) and the School of Foreign Service at the Georgetown University (M.A.). He has been also studying at the Sciences Po, Paris.

He has been working as an analyst for the Center for European Policy Analysis in Washington, D.C., Center for Strategic and International Studies, Centre for International Governance Innovation, General Motors. In 2007 he entered the diplomatic service of Poland. Between 2007 and 2014 he served as an economic counsellor at the embassy in Hanoi. Later, he headed the unit at the Department of Economic Cooperation and analyst at the Department of Foreign Policy Strategy. He was also fellow of the Harvard University Weatherhead Center for International Affairs.

In August 2018, he became an ambassador of Poland to Vietnam. In 2019, Gerwel carried out a competition on Vietnamese Wikipedia, resulting in creating 2000 new articles about Poland. The winner, 23-year-old Võ Ka Anh Duy, who authored more than 800 articles, won 7-day trip to Poland. on 30 November 2022, Gerwel ended his term.

On 6 December 2022, he was nominated Undersecretary of State at the Ministry of Foreign Affairs for Economic Cooperation, the United Nations and Asia.

Gerwel was honoured with Vietnamese Friendship Order. Besides Polish, he speaks French, English, German and Russian. He is married, with a daughter.

References 

1978 births
Ambassadors of Poland to Vietnam
Walsh School of Foreign Service alumni
Living people
People from Gdynia
Simon Fraser University alumni
Recipients of the Friendship Order
Year of birth missing (living people)